The Aargau S-Bahn ( or ) is an S-Bahn-style regional rail network serving the canton of Aargau, Switzerland.

History
Upon the timetable change on 14 December 2008, an S-Bahn numbering system was introduced for regional rail services in Aargau.

The new S-Bahn network was designed to complement the existing adjacent S-Bahn networks in Central Switzerland, Zurich and Basel.  With that in mind, the line numbers selected for the new network were in the 20s (except the S14 Menziken–Aarau–Schöftland), so that there would be no conflict with the other networks.
 
The new network was essentially a redesignation of its existing lines. No new stops were built for it, and no new rolling stock was purchased.  In some cases, however, certain services in the 2007/2008 timetable were modified (e.g. the Langenthal–Baden through connection), and to a limited extent the frequency of services was increased.

On 15 December 2019 the S29 was extended from Aarau to Sursee, replacing the Lucerne S-Bahn S8.

Lines
, the network consists of the following lines.

Map

Related services
With the December 2021 timetable change, Swiss Federal Railways applied "S" designations to three Regio services in the canton of Solothurn:

 :  / ( –) –Olten
 : –Solothurn
 : –

These were numbered S20–S22 to avoid conflicts with the Aargau S-Bahn and are not part of the network.

See also

Transport in Aargau

References

External links

 AAR bus+bahn– official site 
 SBB-CFF-FFS – official site 

S-Bahn in Switzerland
S-Bahn